Terrence Wisdom (born December 4, 1971) is a former American football guard. He played for the New York Jets in 1995.

References

1971 births
Living people
American football offensive guards
Syracuse Orange football players
New York Jets players
London Monarchs players
Scottish Claymores players